Govind Mathur (born 14 April 1959) is an Indian Judge. He is former Chief Justice of Allahabad High Court and former Judge of Allahabad High Court and Rajasthan High Court.

Career
Hon'ble Mr. Justice Govind Mathur was appointed additional judge of Rajasthan High Court on 2 September 2004. He was promoted to permanent judge on 29 May 2006.
He was transferred to Allahabad High Court on 21 November 2017. On 24 October 2018, being the senior most Justice of court, he was appointed acting Chief Justice of the Allahabad High Court. On 10 November 2018, he was appointed Chief Justice of Allahabad High Court. 

On 14 November 2018, he took oath as Chief Justice of Allahabad High Court.
He retired on 13 April 2021.

Justice Mathur frequently adopted a pro-human rights, pro-privacy, and pro-free speech approach while deciding issues and believed in the Court's duty as a guardian of fundamental rights.

References

Judges of the Allahabad High Court
Living people
1959 births
Place of birth missing (living people)
Judges of the Rajasthan High Court
Chief Justices of the Allahabad High Court
21st-century Indian judges